Sireți is a village in Strășeni District, Moldova. Sireți has a population of 5833 people. It is near lake Ghidighici, the largest man-made lake in Moldova.

References

Villages of Strășeni District
Kishinyovsky Uyezd